Baranavichy is a city in the Brest Region of western Belarus, with a population of 179,000 (2019 estimate). It is notable for an important railway junction and is home to Baranavichy State University.

General information 
The city of Baranavichy is located on the Baranavichy Plain in the interfluve of Shchara and its tributary Myshanka. Baranavichy is located virtually on the straight line, connecting regional centre Brest (206 km) and Minsk (149 km). Nearby cities: Lyakhavichy (17 km), Slonim (42 km), Nyasvizh (51 km), Navahrudak (52 km), and Hantsavichy (72 km). Baranavichy is located on flat terrain where the height difference does not exceed 20 m (from 180 to 200 m above sea level). The altitude of the city is 193 m above sea level. Total length of the city is 10 km from west to east and 7 km from south to north. The city is somewhat extended (by 8 km) in the southwest (from Brestskaya street) to the northeast direction (to Fabrichnaya street) and compressed (6.3 km) in the north (Sovetskaya street) to the southeast direction (Frolenkov street). Total area occupied by the city is 80.66 sq. km. (8066 ha as of 12 August 2012). The population density is more than 2,000 people per sq. km.

The northernmost point of the city is Korolik street located to the north of the plant Baranovichsky automatic lines at 53°10' north latitude, and the southernmost is village Uznogi located at 53°06' north latitude. The extreme western point is located in the vicinity of Badaka street at 25°57' east longitude, and the extreme eastern point is located in the vicinity of the intersection of Egorov street and Kashtanovaya street at 26°04' east longitude. The geometric centre of the city is Lenin square. In total, the city has about five hundred streets and lanes with the overall length of 252.8 km, 129.8 km of which are landscaped and 240 km are lit.

The city of Baranavichy is characterized by a favourable geographical position and is a major junction of the most important railways and highways. There is a close location of the main gas pipeline, a developed system of energy and water supply, and a favourable climate. A number of large industrial enterprises are located in the city.

As of 1 January 2019, 81,829 passenger cars are registered in Baranavichy. 146,678 adult residents live in the city. Thus, almost every second citizen of the city owns a passenger car.

The city of Baranavichy is not only one of the largest cities of the Republic of Belarus in terms of population (eighth largest in the country), but also one of the most important industrial, cultural and educational centres of Belarus.

At the beginning of the year 2010, Baranavichy had 21 sister cities, among which Russian Mytishchi (Moscow Oblast), Vasileostrovsky district of St. Petersburg, Finnish Heinola, Austrian Stockerau, Polish Biala Podlaska, Gdynia, Sulentsin povet, Chinese Chibi, Italian Ferrara, Latvian Jelgava, Ukrainian Poltava, Novovolynsk and others.

History

Early history 
In the second half of the 17th century, Baranavichy housed the Jesuit mission. In the second half of the 18th century, Baranavichy was the property of Massalski and Niesiołowski families. The village was administratively part of the Nowogródek Voivodeship until the Third Partition of Poland (1795), when it was annexed by Imperial Russia. In the 19th century, it belonged to the Countess E.A. Rozwadowski. It was part of the Novogrodek (now Navahrudak) okrug, which was part of Slonim Governorate, the Lithuania Governorate, the Grodno Governorate and then the Minsk Governorate.

Growth 

The town's history began on 17 (29) November 1871, the beginning of construction of a movement to the new section of the Smolensk-Brest. The name of the station arose during construction was that the nearby village, Baranavichy, whose first mention in the testament of A.E Sinyavskaya in 1627. Then, in 1871, not far from the station, the locomotive depot was built.

In 1874 came the appearance of the railway junction. In the wooden station buildings lived the railway workers of Baranavichy. The new railway linked Moscow with the western outskirts of Imperial Russia.

The impetus for more intensive settlement of the areas adjacent to the station from the south was the May 27, 1884 decision by the governor of Minsk to build a town, Rozvadovo, on the lands of the landlord, Rozwadowski. The town was built according to the governor's plan approved. In the village were 120 houses and 500 people.

The plans approved by Emperor Alexander III assumed that there would be also one railway linking Vilnius, Luninets, Pinsk and Rovno. Therefore, 2.5 km from the station, the Moscow-Brest railway crossed the track Vilnius-Rovno from Polesie railways. At the junction was another station, Baranavichy (according to Polesie Railways), which became the second centre of the city.

As before, workers and traders settled near the station. The new settlement was called New Baranavichy, unlike Rozvadovo, which became informally called Old Baranavichy. It was developed on the land owned by peasants of the villages near the new station (Svetilovichi, Gierow and Uznogi). More convenient than the landlords' land, its lease terms and proximity to administrative agencies contributed to the rapid growth of this settlement.

20th century 
At the beginning of World War I, Baranavichy was the location for the Stavka, the headquarters of the Russian General Staff, until the Great Retreat.

After the settlement was left by the Germans, it was captured on January 5, 1919 by the Soviets. In the early stages of the Polish–Soviet War, it was briefly captured by the Poles on 18 March 1919 and again captured, for longer, in April 1919, five months after Poland regained independence. The Russians retook it on 17 July 1920, but the Poles took it again on 30 September 1920.

On 1 August 1919, it received city rights and became a powiat centre in the Polish Nowogródek Voivodeship. In 1921, Baranowicze had over 11,000 inhabitants (67% Jews, the rest being mostly Belarusians, Poles and Russians). Soon, the city started to grow and became an important centre of trade and commerce for the area. The city's Orthodox cathedral was built in the Neoclassical style in 1924 to 1931 and was decorated with mosaics that had survived the demolition of the Alexander Nevsky Cathedral, Warsaw. In 1930, a monument to Hungarian Lieutenant colonel Artur Buol, a hero of Polish fights in the Polish–Soviet War, was unveiled in Baranowicze. In the interbellum, the grandparents and the father of Polish politicians Lech Kaczyński and Jarosław Kaczyński lived in Baranowicze.

The city was also an important military garrison, with a KOP Cavalry Brigade, the 20th Infantry Division and the Nowogródzka Cavalry Brigade stationed there. Because of the fast growth of local industry, a local branch of the Polish Radio was opened in 1938. In 1939 Baranavichy had almost 30,000 inhabitants and was the biggest and the most important city in the Nowogródek Voivodeship.

After the invasion of Poland, the Soviet Union took the city on 17 September 1939, and annexed it to the Byelorussian Soviet Socialist Republic. The local Jewish population of 9,000 was joined by approximately 3,000 Jewish refugees from the Polish areas occupied by Germany. After the start of Operation Barbarossa, the city was seized by the Wehrmacht on June 27, 1941. It was part of Generalbezirk Weißruthenien in Reichskommissariat Ostland during the German occupation. In August 1941, a ghetto (the  Baranavichy Ghetto) was created in the city, with more than 12,000 Jews kept in terrible conditions in six buildings at the outskirts. From March 4 to December 14, 1942, the entire Jewish population of the ghetto was sent to various extermination camps and killed in gas chambers. Only about 250 survived the war.

The city was liberated by the Red Army on 8 July 1944. It was also the seat of the Baranavichy Voblast from 1939 to 1941 and again from 1944 to 1954. Meanwhile, intensive industrialization took place. In 1991, the city became part of independent Belarus.

Climate

Sights 
As a fairly young city, Baranavichy does not have many cultural heritage monuments. Most are buildings erected in the interwar period, including the Catholic Church of the Exaltation of the Holy Cross, the former Bank of Poland building, the building of the Polish Radio Baranowicze station, the fire station and the Orthodox Church of the Protection of the Holy Virgin. Few old houses from the early 20th century are preserved. There is a railway museum in the city.

Transport 

The city is on the main east-west highway in Belarus, the M1, which forms a part of European route E30.

The first rail line through the city opened in around 1870. Additional railways built helped the city become an important rail junction.

The large airbase, south of the city, is used by the Belarusian Air Force.

Notable people 

Mirosław Araszewski, Polish photographer and cinematographer
Maja Berezowska, Polish painter
Abraham Foxman, former CEO of Anti-Defamation League
Alina Kabata-Pendias (1929-2019), scientist
Lidia Korsakówna, Polish theater and film actress
 Ihar Losik (1992), Belarusian blogger and activist recognised by Amnesty International as a political prisoner
Kazimierz Świątek, Roman Catholic Cardinal and archbishop
Elchonon Wasserman, rabbi and Rosh Yeshiva
Valeriya Novodvorskaya, Soviet dissident, writer and liberal politician
Valanсin Taŭlaj (:be:Валянцін Таўлай), Belarusian Soviet poet

Twin towns – sister cities

Baranavichy is twinned with:

 Biała Podlaska, Poland
 Chibi, China
 Jelgava, Latvia
 Kaliningrad, Russia
 Karlovo, Bulgaria
 Kineshma, Russia
 Konyaaltı, Turkey
 Magadan, Russia
 Mytishchi, Russia
 Nacka, Sweden
 Poltava, Ukraine
 Solntsevo (Moscow), Russia
 Stockerau, Austria
 Sulęcin County, Poland
 Vasileostrovsky (Saint Petersburg), Russia
 Yeysky District, Russia

Significant depictions in popular culture
 Baranavichy is one of the starting towns of Lithuania in the turn-based strategy game Medieval II: Total War: Kingdoms.

See also 
FC Baranovichi
Polish Radio Baranowicze

References

External links 

 Baranavichy city portal
 Modern views of Baranavichy
 INTEX-PRESS online - latest news of Baranavichy region
 Public Transport in Baranavichy
 Baranavichy University Photos

Sports-related links:
 Football in Baranavichy

History-related links:
 Photos on Radzima.org
 Baranowicze Radio Station
 Pre-war photos of Baranavichy
 Baranavichy in history
 Baranavichy. Synagogues
 British 1:25,000 map from 1943

 
Baranavichy District
Cities in Belarus
Holocaust locations in Belarus
Novogrudsky Uyezd
Nowogródek Voivodeship (1919–1939)
Populated places in Brest Region